Muhammad Sohrab Hossain (died 1998) was a Bangladesh Awami League politician and the Minister of Fisheries and Livestock, from April 1972 to March 1973. In the next term he was the Ministry of Housing and Public Works.

Early life 
Sohrab Hossain was born in Magura in 1922. Graduated in science with distinction from the University of Calcutta in 1946, briefly taught mathmetics at Jessore Zila School 1947–1948, then studied law at Dhaka University with Sheikh Mujibur Rahman and Mollah Jalaluddin.

Career 
He started practicing as a lawyer at Magura Bar and established Magura Awami League in 1953-54 being its first general secretary, subsequently becoming the president of Magura Mohakuma and Jessore District Awami League and the agriculture secretary of East Pakistan Awami League. He was elected Member of Pakistan National Assembly in 1962 and 1970. He was instrumental in the movement against Ayub Khan both in and outside Pakistan Parliament in the '60s and led the Southern East Pakistan against the Pakistani Military Junta and was one of the founder fathers of Bangladesh. He was appointed Forest, Fisheries, Livestock, and then Public Works Urban Development and Housing Minister in 1972 until 1975. During the famine of 1974 he was given the additional responsibility of the Ministry of Relief and Rehabilitation and successfully averted the famine.

Death 
He suffered from alzheimer's disease and died in January 1998 at the age of 77. He is survived by his seven sons and one daughter. He was buried in his hometown of Magura.

References

Awami League politicians
1998 deaths
Housing and Public Works ministers of Bangladesh
Fisheries and Livestock ministers of Bangladesh
Public Administration ministers of Bangladesh
Disaster Management and Relief ministers of Bangladesh
People from Magura District
Pakistani MNAs 1962–1965
Bangladesh Krishak Sramik Awami League central committee members